General Wharton may refer to:

Gabriel C. Wharton (1824–1906), Confederate States Army brigadier general
James Edward Wharton (1894–1944), U.S. Army brigadier general
John A. Wharton (1828–1865), Confederate States Army major general
John F. Wharton (general) (born c. 1957), United States Army major general
Robert Wharton (Philadelphia) (1757–1834), Pennsylvania Militia brigadier general